Natia Skhirtladze (born 3 March 1990) is a Georgian football defender.

External links 
 

Living people
1990 births
Women's footballers from Georgia (country)
Georgia (country) women's international footballers
Women's association football forwards